Petroto is a village of the Oraiokastro municipality. The village was part of the municipality of Kallithea before the 2011 local government reform. Petroto is a part of the community of Mesaio.

The 2011 census recorded 289 inhabitants in the village.

See also
 List of settlements in the Thessaloniki regional unit

References

Populated places in Thessaloniki (regional unit)